Michael John Gordon (born July 7, 1985) is an Australian composer, record producer, musician, and sound designer, composing music primarily for video games.

Gordon has composed for several first-person shooters, including Atomic Heart, LawBreakers, Wolfenstein: The New Order, Wolfenstein: The Old Blood, Prey, the 2016 reboot of Doom and its sequel Doom Eternal, Wolfenstein II: The New Colossus, and seasons one and two of the 2013 fighting game Killer Instinct.

Career
Gordon began his musical career as a jazz/blues guitarist in his teens. He first began to work as a sound designer with Pandemic Studios, where he contributed additional sound design for Destroy All Humans! 2. In 2013, he scored the first season of the fighting video game, Killer Instinct, a reboot of the original 1994 title. The following year, Gordon scored the second season of Killer Instinct and the action-adventure first-person shooter Wolfenstein: The New Order (developed by MachineGames). He returned to the Wolfenstein series in 2015 to compose the score for Wolfenstein: The Old Blood, a prequel to Wolfenstein: The New Order.

In 2016, Gordon completed the score for the science fiction first-person shooter, Doom, the sequel to Doom 64 and soft reboot of the franchise, developed by id Software. His score for Doom won a number of awards including a D.I.C.E. Award for Outstanding Achievement in Original Music Composition, SXSW Gaming Award for Excellence in Musical Score, The Game Awards Best Music/Sound Design and was nominated for a BAFTA Games Award for Best Music.

In 2017, Gordon completed the score for the horror first-person shooter, Prey, developed by Arkane Studios.  He also worked alongside Martin Stig Andersen to again return to the Wolfenstein series, scoring Wolfenstein II: The New Colossus, developed by MachineGames.

In 2020, Gordon completed the score of Doom Eternal; while the music for the game was once again well-received, circumstances around the soundtrack release led to a public falling out between Gordon and id Software and a parting of ways. In November 2022, Gordon addressed this dispute in a lengthy statement on Medium.

On 23 June 2020 British rock band Bring Me the Horizon announced they would be working with Gordon on their upcoming release. Vocalist Oliver Sykes discusses how he fell in love with the Doom Eternal soundtrack during quarantine. Being heavily inspired by Gordon's work, the band decided to reach out to him and offer a collaboration. The resulting work, titled "Parasite Eve", was released on 25 June alongside an accompanying music video. The collaboration then expanded into the commercial release, Post Human: Survival Horror, released on 30 October 2020.

id Software controversy
Following the release of Doom Eternals OST in April 2020, several online music bloggers and fans noted the disparity in quality between the Doom (2016) OST and the one released with Eternal.

On 19 April, Gordon confirmed on Twitter that much of it was not his work. Subsequently, Marty Stratton, an executive producer at id Software, posted an open letter on Reddit that alleged Gordon did not provide the source material for the additional tracks on the OST and that he required a contractual extension to get the OST completed in time.

Following this, public outcry against Gordon reached a level where he received explicit death threats and graphic messages of intent to harm him and his family. Gordon's message accounts, servers and phones were allegedly inundated with abuse, seriously impacting his mental health.

On 9 November 2022, Gordon published an article on Medium explaining his side of the story in the form of a defensive rebuttal of the accusations in Stratton's post. It made several statements that the open letter from Stratton contained lies. He called out claims made by Stratton accusing him of not providing the original source material for the soundtrack, and that Bethesda had to grant him an extension to finish the OST when in reality, he had not even been contracted to create the OST at the time of the delay. This in turn led to his reputation in the industry being harmed.

Gordon provided a variety of forms of evidence including photographs of emails to verify his claims.

Gordon further stated that when his lawyers requested that the open letter be removed in response to this and other evidence, he was instead offered "a six-figure payout" in exchange for a lifetime gag order without the removal of the original letter. He also alleged that he was not compensated for more than half of the music that ended up being used in the final release of the game.

Musical style and inspiration
According to Gordon's official website, he "utilises a broad range of modern musical sound design and traditional composition techniques in order to be unconstrained by any singular genre,"
and that it is "inspired by the connection between the audience and the experience."

Gordon's work "considers the role of music as a translation of the world in which it exists rather than a simple accompaniment."

Discography

Soundtrack albums

Production credits

Works

Awards and nominations

References

External links
 

Australian composers
Australian male composers
Living people
Video game composers
1985 births